Day 40 is a Canadian animated short film, directed by Sol Friedman and released in 2014. The film is a retelling of the story of Noah's Ark, told from the perspective of the animals.

The film was named to the Toronto International Film Festival's year-end Canada's Top Ten list for 2014, and received a Canadian Screen Award nomination for Best Animated Short Film at the 3rd Canadian Screen Awards.

References

External links

2014 films
Canadian animated short films
2014 animated films
2014 short films
2010s Canadian films